Live at the Jazz Cafe is a live album by American R&B and neo soul musician D'Angelo, released on June 30, 1998, on EMI Records. It was later released in Japan on December 7, 1999, with a bonus track. The live recordings are taken from D'Angelo's appearance at the Jazz Café in London, England, on September 14, 1995. The album was subsequently re-issued in 2014 with a recording of the complete show, including previously unreleased tracks.

Track listing
Me and Those Dreamin' Eyes of Mine (D'Angelo) – 4:52
Can't Hide Love (Skip Scarborough) – 4:09
Cruisin' (Smokey Robinson, Marv Tarplin) – 6:34
S***, Damn, Mother****** (D'Angelo) – 5:37
Lady (D'Angelo, R Saadiq) – 7:03
Brown Sugar (D'Angelo, Ali Shaheed Muhammad) – 10:41
Heaven Must Be Like This (Clarence "Satch" Satchell; James "Diamond" Williams; Leroy "Sugarfoot" Bonner; Marshall "Rock" Jones; Marvin Pierce; Ralph "Pee Wee" Middlebrooks) (Ohio Players cover) [Japan Bonus Track] - 4:12

2014 Reissues: The Complete Show
Introduction – 0:47
Fencewalk – 1:48
Sweet Sticky Thing – 1:34
Jonz In My Bones – 3:55
Me and Those Dreamin' Eyes of Mine (D'Angelo) – 4:48
S***, Damn, Mother****** (D'Angelo) – 5:40
Cruisin' (Robinson, Taplin) – 6:38
I'm Glad You're Mine – 6:14
Lady (D'Angelo, Raphael Saadiq) – 8:59
Announcement – 0:39
Can't Hide Love (Skip Scarborough) – 4:06
Brown Sugar (D'Angelo, Ali Shaheed Muhammad) – 10:45

Personnel 
D'Angelo 	        - Main Performer / Rhodes
Kedar Massenburg  	- Executive Producer
Angie Stone 	- Vocals
Jerry Brooks 	        - Bass
Norman "Keys" Hurt     - Auxiliary keyboards / organ
Abe Fogle              - Drums
Yoshitaka Aikawa 	- Director
Mike Campbell 	        - Guitar
Karen Bernod 	- Vocals
Debbie Cole 	        - Vocals

Charts

References

External links
 Live at the Jazz Cafe at Discogs

D'Angelo albums
1998 live albums
EMI Records live albums
Quiet storm albums